Here is the list of Argentine sports federations :

Bridge: Argentine Bridge Association (Asociación del Bridge Argentino)
Scrabble: Argentine Scrabble Association (Asociación Argentina de Scrabble)
Chess: Argentine Chess Federation (Federación Argentina de Ajedrez)
Handball: Argentine Handball Confederation (Confederación Argentina de Handball) 
Football: Argentine Football Association (Asociación del Futbol Argentino) 
Fencing: Argentine Fencing Federation (Federación Argentina de Esgrima) 
Judo: Argentine Judo Confederation (Confederación Argentina de Judo)
Athletics: Argentine Athletics Confederation (Confederación Argentina de Atletismo)
Boxing: Argentine Boxing Federation (Federación Argentina de Boxeo)

 
Governing bodies